Faiz Ali Faiz (Urdu: فیض علی فیض; born in 1962 in Sharaqpur, Pakistan) is a well-known Pakistani qawwali singer.

Faiz was born into a family of seven generations of qawwals.  He studied classical music with Ustad Ghulam Shabir Khan and Ustad Jafat Khan, and qawwali music with Muhammad Ali Faridi and Abdur Rahim Faridi Qawwal.

Faiz Ali Faiz was nominated for a BBC Radio 3 World Music Award in 2005 and 2006.

Discography
 The New Qawwali Voice (2003)
 Ton Amour Me Fait Danser (Your Love Makes Me Dance) (2005)
 Qawwali-Flamenco, with Duquende, Miguel Poveda and Chicuelo (2006)
 Chalo Achha Hua (2007)
 Nigahen (2007)
 Chand (2007)
 Tera Deewana (2007)
 Mulaqat (2007)
 Jaadu: Magic, with Titi Robin (2009)

See also
Islamic music
Music of Pakistan
List of Pakistani musicians

References

External links
BBC Radio Profile on Faiz Ali Faiz
NPR review of "Your Love Makes Me Dance"
Faiz Ali Faiz | Live at the 2017 International Festival on YouTube

1962 births
Living people
Qawwali
Pakistani male singers
Pakistani qawwali singers
Pakistani qawwali groups
Performers of Sufi music
Punjabi people